Casearia sylvestris is a Brazilian plant in the family Salicaceae. It is catalogued by the Brazilian Unified Health System as a plant of interest for the Brazilian population with the purpose of treating inflammatory disorders.

Safety
Studies show that it is safe even when used for long periods.

References

sylvestris
Taxa named by Olof Swartz